In ancient Roman religion and myth, Hercules was venerated as a divinized hero and incorporated into the legends of Rome's founding. The Romans adapted Greek myths and the iconography of Heracles into their own literature and art, but the hero developed distinctly Roman characteristics. Some Greek sources as early as the 6th and 5th century BC gave Heracles Roman connections during his famous labors.

Dionysius of Halicarnassus places Hercules among divine figures honored at Rome "whose souls after they had left their mortal bodies are said to have ascended to Heaven and to have obtained the same honors as the gods." His apotheosis thus served as one model during the Empire for the concept of the deified emperor.

Temples and topography

The divine Hercules received cult at Rome as early as the 6th century BC, at a temple next to the shrine of Carmenta and the Porta Carmentalis. By the 5th century BC, the mythological tradition was well established that Hercules had visited Rome during his tenth labor, when he stole the cattle of Geryon in the far west and drove them through Italy. Several Augustan writers offer narratives of the hero's time in Rome to explain the presence of the Ara Maxima dedicated to Hercules in the Forum Boarium, the "Cattle Market" named because of Geryon's stolen herd.

The Temple of Hercules Victor, which still stands, is atypically round, as was the Temple of Hercules Musarum in the Circus Flaminius. The latter displayed fasti, attributed to Marcus Fulvius Nobilior, which Jörg Rüpke places among the earliest Latin antiquarian literature; the poet Ennius may have influenced or contributed to their composition. Fulvius had attracted harsh criticism for enriching himself excessively with booty plundered from temples during his military campaigns. When he became censor, he added a portico to an existing temple of Hercules, most likely that of Hercules Magnus Custos ("Hercules the Great Guardian") in the Campus Martius. He then transferred a statue group of the Muses from his private collection to dedicate at the temple, which later housed the poets' guild (collegium poetarum).

Several place names in Italy were connected to Hercules' adventures. Vitulia as a name for the Italian peninsula supposedly came into usage because Hercules chased a runaway bullock (vitulus) there.

The altar of Iuppiter Praestes at Tibur was supposed to have been established by Hercules himself.

Cult titles
Hercules Augustus or Hercules Augusti, Hercules "in his capacity as protector of the ruling emperor."
 Hercules Invictus ("the Unconquered"), at the Ara Maxima; women were excluded from this cult. Also Hercules Victor ("the Victorious").
Hercules Magnus ("the Great"), honored with games (ludi) that may have been first officially established by Sulla.
Hercules Musarum ("the Muses' Hercules", Greek Herakles Musagetes), created when Fulvius Nobilior dedicated statues of the Muses to a temple of Hercules.
 Hercules Olivarius ("the Olive Merchant"), in reference to a statue of Hercules dedicated by the guild of olive merchants.
 Hercules Triumphalis ("Triumphal"), represented by a statue in the Forum Boarium, was dressed in the regalia of a triumphator when a triumph was held. It is mentioned by Pliny, who attributes it to the legendary Evander.

Festivals and rituals

Normally only those celebrating the rites took part in the communal meal that followed a sacrifice, but at the Ara Maxima, all male citizens were invited. None of the meat that resulted from the sacrifice could be allowed to remain at the end of the day, nor could it be removed from the precinct, so it all had to be eaten. Women were excluded from this rite. Macrobius explains:

When Hercules with Geryon's cattle was journeying over the fields of Italy, a woman, in reply to his request for water to quench his thirst, said that she was not allowed to give him any because it was the feast of the Women's Goddess and no man was permitted to taste of anything that concerned it. Hercules therefore, when he intended to institute a sacrifice, solemnly forbade women to be admitted, ordering Potitius and Pinarius who were in charge of the rites not to allow any woman to be present.

The "women's goddess" (dea feminarum) is usually taken as the Bona Dea. This relationship, however, should perhaps be thought of as complementary as well as adversarial; Hercules, Bona Dea, and Silvanus were honored jointly with a shrine and an altar in Regio XIII at Rome. The "Good Goddess" is identifiable with several goddesses, and in this instance her enmity with Hercules recalls that of Juno. She also shared some characteristics with Ceres, with whom Hercules was honored jointly on December 21, with the sacrifice of a pregnant sow, loaves of bread, and mulsum, sweet wine.

Hercules was among the divinities honored at the first lectisternium held at Rome in 399 BC.

Genealogy and patronage

Several Roman clans (gentes) lay claim to descent from various divine figures. The Fabii traced their genealogy to a daughter of Evander who lay with Hercules in his "dug-out" (fovea) and conceived the first Fabius.

The cult of Hercules at the Ara Maxima was in the keeping of the gens Potitia and the gens Pinaria until 312 BC, when maintenance was transferred to the state and thereafter administered by public slaves.

The emperor Commodus chose Hercules as a personal patron, and often had himself depicted in Hercules' garb. In 184 AD, Commodus renamed all the months of the year after names and aspects of himself, including a mensis Herculeus that was either September or October (ancient sources vary as to which). The innovation was repealed after his murder in 192.

Mythological background
Later Roman sources suggest that the imported Greek hero replaced a mythic Italic shepherd called "Recaranus" or "Garanus", famous for his strength. This hero dedicated the Ara Maxima which became associated with the earliest Roman cult of Hercules.

References

External links

Hercules